Anatoli Yuryevich Sedykh (born 1 May 1970) is a former Russian football player.

References

1970 births
Living people
Soviet footballers
Russian footballers
Russian Premier League players
Russian expatriate footballers
Expatriate footballers in Belarus
FC Energiya Volzhsky players
FC Tekstilshchik Kamyshin players
FC SKA-Karpaty Lviv players
FC Halychyna Drohobych players
FC Rotor Volgograd players
FC Elista players
FC Dynamo Stavropol players
FC Slavyansk Slavyansk-na-Kubani players
FC Kuban Krasnodar players
FC Spartak-UGP Anapa players
FC Olimpia Volgograd players
FC SKA Rostov-on-Don players
FC SKVICH Minsk players
PFC CSKA Moscow players
Association football forwards